Megacraspedus peyerimhoffi is a moth of the family Gelechiidae. It was described by Ferdinand Le Cerf in 1925. It is found in Algeria.

References

Moths described in 1925
Megacraspedus